Stigmasterol – a plant sterol (phytosterol) – is among the most abundant of plant sterols, having a major function to maintain the structure and physiology of cell membranes. In the European Union, it is a food additive listed with E number E499, and may be used in food manufacturing to increase the phytosterol content, potentially lowering the levels of LDL cholesterol.

Discovery 

Once called Wulzen factor in the mid-20th century, stigmasterol was discovered by the University of California physiologist Rosalind Wulzen (born 1886).

Natural occurrences 
Stigmasterol is an unsaturated phytosterol occurring in the plant fats or oils of numerous plants, such as soybean, calabar bean, and rape seed, and in herbs used in herbalism practices, including the Chinese herbs Ophiopogon japonicus (Mai men dong), in Mirabilis jalapa.

Stigmasterol is a constituent of various vegetables, legumes, nuts, seeds, and unpasteurized milk. Pasteurization will inactivate stigmasterol. Edible oils contains higher amount than vegetables.

Uses 
Stigmasterol is a food additive in manufactured food products in the United Kingdom and European Union. It was introduced as a precursor by Percy Lavon Julian for industrial large-scale manufacture of semisynthetic progesterone, a valuable human hormone that plays an important physiological role in the regulatory and tissue rebuilding mechanisms related to estrogen effects, as well as acting as an intermediate in the biosynthesis of androgens, estrogens, and corticoids. It is also used as the precursor of vitamin D3.

The Upjohn company used stigmasterol as the starting raw material for commercial synthesis of cortisone in 1959.

Research
As one of the major phytosterols, stigmasterol is included among sterol compounds in the diet having potential to reduce the risk of cardiovascular diseases. Consumption of 2 grams per day of plant sterols is associated with a reduction in blood LDL cholesterol of 8–10%, possibly lowering cardiovascular disease risk. As a factor in cellular processes of plants, stigmasterol may have roles in plant stress responses, metabolism, and enzymes involved in biosynthesis of plant cell membranes. Stigmasterol has also been shown to exert anti-angiogenic and anti-cancer effects via the downregulation of TNF-alpha and VEGFR-2.

Potential precursor of boldenone 
Being a steroid, stigmasterol is precursor of anabolic steroid boldenone. Boldenone undecylenate is commonly used in veterinary medicine to induce growth in cattle, but it is also one of the most commonly abused anabolic steroids in sports. This led to suspicion that some athletes testing positive for boldenone didn't consume the steroid itself, but rather consumed foods rich in stigmasterol; this turned out not to be the case.

See also 
 Charantin, a stigmasteryl glucoside found in the bitter melon plant.
 Stigmastanol, a closely related phytosterol
 Sitosterol, a commonly occurring phytosterol

References 

Phytosterols